The Battery A, Maryland Light Artillery ("Rigby's Battery"), was an artillery battery that served in the Union Army during the American Civil War. It briefly served as infantry from July 3, 1864 until March 11, 1865.

Service
The battery was organized Baltimore and Pikesville, Maryland August through September 1861 for a three-year enlistment under the command of Captain John W. Wolcott.

The battery was attached to Dix's Command, Baltimore, Maryland, to May 1862. 4th Brigade, Artillery Reserve, V Corps, Army of the Potomac, to September 1862. Artillery, 1st Division, VI Corps, to May 1863. 4th Volunteer Brigade, Artillery Reserve, Army of the Potomac, to July 1863. 3rd Volunteer Brigade, Artillery Reserve, Army of the Potomac, to October 1863. Artillery Brigade, I Corps, Army of the Potomac, to March 1864. Camp Barry, Defenses of Washington, XXII Corps, to May 1864. 1st Brigade, DeRussy's Division, XXII Corps, to July 1864. Reserve Division, Harpers Ferry, West Virginia, to January 1865. 3rd Brigade, 3rd Division, West Virginia, to March 1865.

Battery A, Maryland Light Artillery ceased to exist on March 11, 1865 when it was consolidated with Battery B, Maryland Light Artillery.

Detailed service
Duty at Baltimore, Md., and on the eastern shore of Maryland until May 1862. Joined the Army of the Potomac on the Virginia Peninsula. Peninsula Campaign June to August. Seven Days Battles before Richmond June 25-July 1. Battles of Mechanicsville June 26. Savage's Station June 29. White Oak Swamp June 30. Malvern Hill July 1. At Harrison's Landing till August 15. Movement to Fort Monroe and Alexandria August 15-22. Maryland Campaign September 6-22. Battle South Mountain, Md., September 14. Antietam September 16-17. At Downsville, Md., till October 29. Movement to Falmouth, Va., October 29-November 19. Battle of Fredericksburg, Va., December 12-15. "Mud March" January 20-24, 1863. At White Oak Church till April 27. Chancellorsville Campaign April 27-May 6. Operations at Franklin's Crossing April 29-May 2. Battle of Maryes Heights, Fredericksburg, May 3. Salem Heights May 3-4. Banks' Ford May 4. Gettysburg Campaign June II-July 24. Battle of Gettysburg July 1-3. Duty on line of the Rappahannock and Rapidan till October. Bristoe Campaign October 9-22. Advance to line of the Rappahannock November 7-8, Mine Run Campaign November 26-December 2. Demonstration on the Rapidan February 6-7, 1864. Morton's Ford February 6-7. At Camp Barry and in the defenses of Washington March to July 1864. Dismounted and ordered to Harpers Ferry, West Virginia, July 3 as infantry. Duty in the District of Harpers Ferry, West Virginia, until March 1865.

Casualties
The battery lost a total of 34 men during service; 6 enlisted men killed or mortally wounded, 28 enlisted men died of disease.

Commanders
 Captain John W. Wolcott - resigned
 Captain James H. Rigby
 1st Lieutenant Thomas Binyon - commanded during the Bristoe Campaign

See also

 List of Maryland Civil War units
 Maryland in the Civil War

References
 Dyer, Frederick H. A Compendium of the War of the Rebellion (Des Moines, IA: Dyer Pub. Co.), 1908.
Attribution

External links
 Battery A, Maryland Light Artillery monument at Antietam Battlefield
 Battery A, Maryland Light Light Artillery monument at Gettysburg Battlefield

Military units and formations established in 1861
Military units and formations disestablished in 1865
M
Units and formations of the Union Army from Maryland